Karolína Plíšková and Kristýna Plíšková were the defending champions, but lost in the first round to Annika Beck and Caroline Garcia.
Raluca Olaru and Anna Tatishvili won the title, defeating Beck and Garcia in the final, 6–2, 6–1.

Seeds

Draw

Draw

References
 Main Draw

Generali Ladies Linz - Doubles
Generali Ladies Linz Doubles